Justin Jitae Chon (born May 29, 1981) is a Korean-American actor and filmmaker. He has directed three films, Gook (2017), Ms. Purple (2019), & Blue Bayou (2021). He is also known for portraying Eric Yorkie in The Twilight Saga film series. He is a member of the K-pop parody group Boys Generally Asian.

Early life
Chon was born in Garden Grove, California, and raised in Irvine, California, where he attended University High School. Chon is of Korean descent. His father, Sang Chon, was an actor in South Korea and later a shoe wholesales owner in Paramount, California. His mother is a pianist. He has a younger sister.

Chon attended the University of Southern California (USC), where he majored in business. During college, he studied abroad at Yonsei University in Seoul, South Korea.

Career

Acting

Chon started acting in 2005 in shows such as Jack & Bobby and Taki & Luci. He came to fame in 2006 when he played Peter Wu in the Disney Channel film Wendy Wu: Homecoming Warrior. He also played Tony Lee in the Nickelodeon sitcom Just Jordan. In 2008, he played Eric Yorkie in the film Twilight, based on the book by Stephenie Meyer. Chon reprised his role as Eric Yorkie in the Twilight sequel New Moon. He starred as the central character Jeff Chang, in the film 21 & Over in 2013. He also appeared in the independent film Innocent Blood that same year. 

In 2014, Chon appeared as a lead character in crime drama film Revenge of the Green Dragons, which was executive produced by Martin Scorsese. In 2015, Chon starred as Sid Park, the trouble-making main character influenced by rocker culture in the independent film Seoul Searching, directed by Benson Lee, which made its premiere at the 2015 Sundance Film Festival. 

Chon trained for over two years in the Meisner technique at the Baron Brown Studio in Santa Monica and guest starred in the Studio web series Joanne Brown Is Here with Hana Mae Lee and Joanne Baron in 2016. Chon also held a role in the Korean American comedy drama Dramaworld. In March 2017, he was cast as a series regular in the ABC crime drama Deception.

Chon starred in the 2018 movie High Resolution with Ellie Bamber, directed by Jason Lester. The movie was based on the acclaimed novel Taipei by author Tao Lin.

Directing
Chon also co-wrote (with Kevin Wu), directed, executive produced, and starred in the 2015 feature film Man Up. The film made its premiere at the 2015 CAAMFest. It was also screened at the 2015 Los Angeles Asian Pacific Film Festival, making its West Coast premiere there. The film is set in Hawaii and also stars Kevin Wu, Amy Hill, Parvesh Cheena, Nichole Bloom, Dion Basco, Samantha Futerman and more. In March 2015, the film was acquired by "Off the Dock", a digital studio owned by Lakeshore Entertainment.

Chon has also directed several digital short films that are viewable on his YouTube Channel, including You're Stoopid (2013), Full Circle (2013) and 90 Day Visa (2015).

In 2017, Chon wrote, directed, produced and starred in a film entitled Gook, which premiered at the 2017 Sundance Film Festival, where it won the NEXT Audience Award and was picked up by Samuel Goldwyn Distribution. The film also won Grand Jury Award for Best Narrative Feature Film, Best Director (Justin Chon), Best Actress (Simone Baker), and an Audience Award at the 2017 Los Angeles Asian Pacific Film Festival. The film further won Golden Space Needle Awards for Best Director (2nd Place or 1st Runner-Up) (Justin Chon) and Best Actress (5th Place) (Simone Baker) at the 2017 Seattle International Film Festival.

Other ventures
Chon co-owns a chain of clothing stores, named the Attic, in California. 

In January 2015, he began uploading edited vlogs to his YouTube channel on a weekly basis. Since November 2015, he has uploaded edited vlogs to the channel on a daily basis. He also creates short comedy videos on YouTube with his friends, and has appeared in videos on Ryan Higa (nigahiga)'s YouTube channel. Chon is also a member of BgA (Boys Generally Asian), a parody K-Pop group formed by Higa. The five-member group has released two singles and has risen up many South Korean music charts as well as American music charts.

In 2016, Chon wrote an editorial for NBC about the racism he faced in Hollywood roles and auditions.

Personal life
After dating for over a year, he married Sasha Egorova in October 2014. Their first child was born in December 2017.

Filmography

Film

Directorial work

Television

References

External links
 
 Official Twitter
 Official YouTube

1981 births
American male actors of Korean descent
Male actors from Orange County, California
21st-century American male actors
American male film actors
American male television actors
Living people
People from Garden Grove, California
People from Irvine, California
Video bloggers
Independent Spirit Award winners
Male bloggers